The arrival of the Europeans in 15th century into the then Gold Coast brought Christianity to the land. There were many different cultural groups across the West African region who were practicing different forms of spirituality. As the Europeans explored and took control of parts of the country during the colonial days, so did their religion. Christianity is the religion with the largest following in Ghana. Christian denominations include Catholics,  Methodists, Anglicans, Presbyterians, Lutherans, Seventh-Day Adventists, Pentecostals, Baptists, Evangelical Charismatics, Latter-day Saints, etc.

According to the census figures of the year 2000, out of Ghana's 18.8 million people, Christians made up 69 percent of the population of Ghana. The 2010 Population and Housing Census puts the figure at slightly over 71 percent of the total population of over 24 million people. A 2015 study estimated some 50,000 believers in Christ from a Muslim background.

Denominations

Methodism in Ghana

The Methodist Church Ghana came into existence as a result of the missionary activities of the Wesleyan Methodist Church, inaugurated with the arrival of Joseph Rhodes Dunwell to the Gold Coast (Ghana) in 1835. Like the mother church, the Methodist Church in Ghana was established by people of Anglican background. Roman Catholic and Anglican missionaries came to the Gold Coast from the 15th century. A school was established in Cape Coast by the Anglicans during the time of Philip Quaque, a Ghanaian priest. Those who came out of this school had scriptural knowledge and scriptural materials supplied by the Society for the Propagation of Christian Knowledge. A member a resulting Bible study groups, William De-Graft, requested Bibles through captain Potter of the ship Congo. Not only were Bibles sent, but also a Methodist missionary. In the first eight years of the Church’s life, 11 out of 21 missionaries who worked in the Gold Coast died. Thomas Birch Freeman, who arrived at the Gold Coast in 1838 was a pioneer of missionary expansion. Between 1838 and 1857, he carried Methodism from the coastal areas to Kumasi in the Asante hinterland of the Gold Coast. He also established Methodist Societies in Badagry and AbeoKuta in Nigeria with the assistance of William De-Graft.
By 1854, the church was organized into circuits constituting a district with T.B. Freeman as chairman. Freeman was replaced in 1856 by William West. The district was divided and extended to include areas in the then Gold Coast and Nigeria by the synod in 1878, a move confirmed at the British Conference. The district were Gold Coast (Ghana) District, with T.R. Picot as chairman and Yoruba and Popo District, with John Milum as chairman.

Methodist evangelization of northern Ghana began in 1910. After a long period of conflict with the colonial government, missionary work was established in 1955. Paul Adu was the first indigenous missionary to northern Ghana. In July 1961, the Methodist Church in Ghana became autonomous, and was called the Methodist Church Ghana, based on a deed of foundation, part of the church's Constitution and Standing Orders. The Methodist Church Ghana has a total membership of close to 600,000. The church has 15 dioceses, 3,814 societies, 1,066 pastors, 15,920 local preachers, 24,100 lay leaders, many schools, an orphanage, hospitals and clinics.

Latter-day Saints

The Church of Jesus Christ of Latter-day Saints has 62,000 members in 207 congregations in Ghana.  They also have 28 family history centers, 3 missions, and 1 temple in Ghana.

Impact of Christianity
Various aspects of Ghanaian development and nation-building have all been impacted upon due to the role Christianity plays.

Education

At every level of education in the country, there are mission schools that exist with the purposes of:
Teaching Government of Ghana approved curricula
Imparting moral discipline into students
However, the main aim of establishing these schools is to impact the values of the various faiths or missions into the younger generation to ensure continuity. Almost all mainline churches have schools at the  primary, secondary and tertiary levels of education in the country. Consistently, over 95 percent of the country's top-performing second cycle institutions are all mission schools. The most well-known church-affiliated schools amongst them are:
Aburi Girls' Secondary School - Presbyterian - Aburi
Adisadel College - Anglican - Cape Coast
Archbishop Potter Girls' School - Catholic - Takoradi
Holy Child School - Catholic- Cape Coast
Mfantsipim School - Methodist - Cape Coast
Opoku Ware School - Catholic - Kumasi
Prempeh College - Methodist/Presbyterian - Kumasi
Pope John Senior High School and Minor Seminary - Catholic - Effiduase Koforidua
Presbyterian Boys Secondary School - Presbyterian - Accra
St. Augustine's College - Catholic- Cape coast
St. Louis Secondary School - Catholic - Kumasi
St Mary's Senior High School - Catholic - Accra 
St. Monica's School - Anglican - Mampong
St. Peter's Boys Senior Secondary School - Catholic - Nkwatia Kwahu
St. Roses Girls Secondary School - Catholic - Akwatia
Wesley Girls High School - Methodist - Cape Coast
Mawuli School - Evangelical Presbyterian Church Ghana (Ho)

Health care delivery
Currently, 42% of all the nation's health care needs are catered for by health establishments belonging to various Christian bodies in the country. The umbrella organization of which the various mission hospitals, clinics and facilities are members of is known as the Christian Health Association of Ghana (CHAG). Some of these facilities are in deprived areas of the country. CHAG serves as a link between Government and its Development Partners and CHAG Member Institutions and provides support to its members through capacity strengthening, coordination of activities, lobbying and advocacy, public relations and translation of government policies. The goal of CHAG is to improve the health status of people living in Ghana, especially the marginalized and the impoverished, in fulfillment of Christ's healing ministry. CHAG’s 183 Member Institutions are therefore predominantly located in the rural (underserved) areas. CHAG plays a complementary role to the Ministry of Health (MOH) and the Ghana Health Service (GHS) and is the second largest provider of health services in the country.

Gallery

Selected individuals in Ghanaian Christianity

See also

Basel Mission
Bremen Mission

References